The Concerto for String Quartet and Orchestra in B-flat is a work by the Austrian composer Arnold Schoenberg, freely composed after the Concerto Grosso Op. 6, No. 7 by George Frideric Handel.

The work is divided into four movements:
 Largo – Allegro
 Largo
 Allegretto grazioso
 Hornpipe

Circumstances

The Concerto was written in the summer of 1933. In May of that year Schoenberg had been forced to flee Berlin after the accession of the Nazi Party. He first went to Paris (where he reconverted from Lutheranism to the Judaism of his childhood).  He spent the summer of 1933 with his wife and infant daughter in the French town of Arcachon, a seaside resort near Bordeaux, completing the Concerto there before leaving for permanent residence in America in October. 

The work was first performed on September 26, 1934 in Prague with the Kolisch Quartet as soloists.

The music

Schoenberg wrote of the work: "I was mainly intent on removing the defects of the Handelian style. Just as Mozart did with Handel's Messiah, I have had to get rid of whole handfuls of rosalias and sequences, replacing them with real substance. I also did my best to deal with the other main defect of the Handelian style, which is that the theme is always best when it first appears and grows steadily more insignificant and trivial in the course of the piece".

Similar works
Other works for string quartet and orchestra have been written by John Adams, Morton Feldman, Mehdi Hosseini, Benjamin Lees, Bohuslav Martinů, Emmanuel Nunes, Julián Orbón, Gunther Schuller, Louis Spohr, and Julia Wolfe, while concertos for string quartet and wind orchestra have been written by Walter Piston, Joel Puckett, and Erwin Schulhoff.

Sources

 Program notes by Robert Craft for the recording (Naxos Records 8.557520) of Schoenberg's Concerto for String Quartet and Orchestra in B-flat major performed by the Fred Sherry Quartet with the Twentieth Century Classics Ensemble under the baton of Robert Craft.
 Center in Vienna devoted to Arnold Schoenberg

References

Compositions by Arnold Schoenberg
1933 compositions
Compositions in B-flat major
Schoenberg